Shiina Yasutane (椎名 康胤, died March 1576) was a Japanese daimyō of the Sengoku period, who was lord of the Shiina clan of Etchū Province.  Throughout the 1550s and 1560s he led numerous attacks on the Jinbo clan, and in one of the few documented cases of two generals engaging personally in combat on the field, Yasutane fought with the head of the Jinbo clan, Jinbō Nagamoto, in 1554, at the battle of Imizu.  During this particular clash, he was slashed across the jaw by Nagamoto, which left him with lifelong disfigurement. He is believed to have been assassinated in 1576 by Kojima Motoshige, on the orders of Uesugi Kenshin.

References
 Abe, Yoshichiro "Sengoku no Kassen Zenroku" (戦国の合戦全録) Japan, 1973

Daimyo
1576 deaths
Shiina clan
Year of birth unknown